John Daly is a TV presenter and producer. Daly hosts his own BBC Northern Ireland TV talk show, The John Daly Show.
Daly is also the producer of the RTÉ talent show The Voice of Ireland.

References

External links
John Daly BBC Web Site

Irish television personalities
Living people
Year of birth missing (living people)
Place of birth missing (living people)
People educated at St Michael's Grammar School, Lurgan